Pennsylvania Route 97 (PA 97) is one of two Pennsylvania state highways that carries the PA 97 designation; the other PA 97 is in Adams County. The northern PA 97,  in length, is a north-south highway that terminates at PA 8 at both ends. The southern terminus is in Union City and the northern terminus is in Erie. The Pennsylvania Department of Transportation (PennDOT) internally designates this road SR 0197 to distinguish it from the other PA 97.

Route description

PA 97 starts in the borough of Union City at the junction of PA 8 and PA 97. It travels west for about  until it reaches the borough of Waterford. South of the borough, PA 97 merges with U.S. Route 19 (US 19), joining the Perry Highway and following the U.S. route northward for  through Waterford. North of Waterford, PA 97 splits from US 19 but remains on the Perry Highway. Although both roads head north to the city of Erie, PA 97 takes a more easterly alignment as it travels northward.

After , PA 97 meets Interstate 90 (I-90) at exit 27 immediately south of Erie.  from the exit, PA 97 meets the southern terminus of PA 505. At PA 505, PA 97 separates from the Perry Highway and follows Old French Road north through downtown Erie to its terminus at an intersection with PA 8 two blocks south of US 20.

History
The first designation of PA 97 existed in the 1930s, from US 6 in Waterford to US 19 in Kearsarge on what is now US 19. US 6 traveled along the current PA 97 designation from Waterford to Erie as the Lakes-to-Sea Highway.

By 1940, PA 97 was moved to its current alignment.

Major intersections

See also

References

External links

 Pennsylvania Highways: PA 97 North
 PA 97 at AARoads.com

097N
U.S. Route 6
U.S. Route 19
Transportation in Erie County, Pennsylvania